Susanna Kubelka von Hermanitz is a German-speaking writer living in France.

Biography
She was born in September 1942 in Linz (Austria). Having left high school she briefly worked as a primary school teacher before graduating in English literature. In 1977 she took a Ph.D. with a thesis on the way women were represented in the 18th-century English novel. Later she worked as a journalist for the Vienna newspaper Die Presse. She lived and worked in Australia and England for four years. She is divorced and since 1981 she has permanently settled down in Paris (France). She claims to favor a vegetarian lifestyle.

Her first book Over Forty at Last was published in 1980. Her most successful novel is Ophelia Learns to Swim of 1987. Her most extensive novel Das gesprengte Mieder (The Broken Girdle; not translated yet) came out in 2000.

Her books have been translated into 29 languages and are published in Germany by Verlagsgruppe Lübbe, in France by Editions Belfond (none in print), and in the United States by MacMillan Publishing Company.

Susanna Kubelka is the sister of the Austrian experimental filmmaker Peter Kubelka.

Selected works 
 Endlich über vierzig. Der reifen Frau gehört die Welt (1980)
 Ich fang nochmal an. Glück und Erfolg in der zweiten Karriere (1981)
 Burg vorhanden, Prinz gesucht. Ein heiterer Roman (1983)
 Ophelia lernt schwimmen. Der Roman einer jungen Frau über vierzig (1987)
 Mein Wien (1990)
 Madame kommt heute später (1993)
 Das gesprengte Mieder (2000)
 Der zweite Frühling der Mimi Tulipan (2005)

English translations:
 Over Forty at Last: How to Ignore the "Middle Life" Crisis and Make the Most Out of the Best Years of Your Life, Macmillan (1982)

References

Further reading 
 Kubelka, Susanna (1942-): An article from: Contemporary Authors, Thomson Gale (2007)

External links 
 


1942 births
Living people
20th-century Austrian novelists
21st-century Austrian novelists
20th-century Austrian women writers
21st-century Austrian women writers
Austrian women novelists
Austrian emigrants to France
Feminist writers
Austrian feminists
Austrian people of Czech descent
Austrian expatriates in France
Writers from Linz